Morgan Simianer is an American cheerleader and television personality. She received international recognition after appearing in the Netflix docuseries Cheer. She became a fan favorite due to her sweet personality and her troubled past.

Personal life 
Simianer is originally from Loveland, Colorado. When she was a sophomore in high school, she and her brother were forced to live in a trailer when their father was living with his new wife and her children, and their mother disappeared when they were still very young. When her brother Wyatt turned 18, he left to go search for their mother and Morgan was forced to live alone in the trailer. When her grandparents became aware of the situation, they invited her to live with them. She attended Navarro College in Corsicana, Texas, where she was a member of the cheer team coached by Monica Aldama. In January 2020, she appeared on The Ellen DeGeneres Show, along with other members of the team.

References 

Living people
People from Wyoming
American television personalities
Navarro College cheer alumni
Year of birth missing (living people)